Alan McCrory Wilson (born July 16, 1973) is a South Carolina National Guard officer, attorney, and politician serving as the 51st Attorney General of South Carolina since 2011. He is a member of the Republican Party.

As Attorney General of South Carolina, Wilson has litigated to block same-sex marriage, invalidate the Affordable Care Act, challenge environmental regulations, defend anti-abortion laws, and prohibit masking and vaccine requirements. He has advocated against cannabis decriminalization and Deferred Action for Childhood Arrivals.

Early life and education
Wilson was born Alan McCrory. His father, Michael McCrory, was an Army captain and Vietnam veteran. Joe Wilson adopted Alan when he was three, and Alan took his last name. Along with his three brothers, Alan is an Eagle Scout.

Wilson graduated from Francis Marion University, where he joined the Pi Kappa Alpha Fraternity through the Theta Delta chapter, with a bachelor's degree in political science in 1996, and received a J.D. from the University of South Carolina School of Law in 2002.

Following college, he joined the South Carolina National Guard. He is currently a Colonel in the Judge Advocate General Corps.

Legal career
Wilson interned in the Attorney General's office under Charlie Condon. After law school, he worked for Judge Marc H. Westbrook of the South Carolina Circuit Court. Wilson later served as an Assistant Solicitor and as an Assistant Attorney General. In 2009, he moved to the private sector and started working at the law firm Willoughby & Hoefer in Columbia, South Carolina.

Attorney General of South Carolina

Elections

Henry McMaster did not run for reelection as Attorney General, choosing instead to run for governor, as incumbent Mark Sanford was term-limited. Wilson won the Republican nomination in a runoff election on June 22, 2010, receiving 60 percent of the vote against his opponent Leighton Lord. Wilson defeated Democratic Party candidate Matthew Richardson in the November 2010 general election.

In 2014, Wilson was reelected, defeating the Democratic nominee, Parnell Diggs.

Wilson won a third term in 2018. In the contentious Republican primary, Wilson faced two challengers for renomination, state Representative Todd Atwater and attorney William Herlong of Greenville. Both challengers focused on ethics issues, criticizing Wilson for his connections to the Quinns, who reached a plea deal after being embroiled in a Statehouse corruption investigation. In the initial Republican primary, Wilson received 48.6%, Atwater received 29.7%, and Herlong received almost 22%; because no candidate received a majority, the nomination was decided by a primary runoff election. Although Herlong endorsed Atwater in the runoff, Wilson won renomination, receiving about 65% of the vote to Atwater's 35%. In the 2018 general election, Wilson received about 55% of the vote, defeating the Democratic nominee, Constance Anastopoulo.

Investigation of campaign contributions
In 2013, Wilson self-reported his campaign failed to report at least 84 contributions and expenditures on required public reports. In February 2013, Wilson originally admitted his campaign failed to disclose and report receiving at least 15 separate contributions of unknown amounts. A further investigation in March 2013 revealed at least 68 unreported contributions and 16 unreported expenditures. As the errors were self-reported and the reports were subsequently re-filed, Wilson faced no penalties.

False election-fraud claims
On January 12, 2012, Wilson falsely claimed on Fox News that "We found out that there were over 900 people who died and then subsequently voted. That number could be even higher than that." These claims were untrue, and an exhaustive investigation by the South Carolina Law Enforcement Division found no evidence to support the claims of "zombie voters" in South Carolina.

Same-sex marriage 
In 2014, Wilson asked the South Carolina Supreme Court to block the issuance of marriage licenses to same-sex couples in the state. Wilson waged an exhaustive legal fight to block same-sex marriage in South Carolina, and in 2015, U.S. District Judge Richard Gergel ordered Wilson to pay more than $134,000 in attorneys' fees to plaintiffs who successfully challenged the state's ban on same-sex marriage.

Affordable Care Act litigation 
Wilson supported lawsuits to invalidate the Affordable Care Act.

Threatened litigation against DACA 
In July 2017, Texas Attorney General Ken Paxton led a group of Republican attorneys general from nine other states, including Wilson, plus Idaho Governor Butch Otter, in threatening that they would litigate against the Deferred Action for Childhood Arrivals (DACA) policy that had been put into place by President Barack Obama.

Quinn affair, conflicts with special prosecutor, and grand jury finding on South Carolina corruption
In late 2013, a State Law Enforcement Division report focusing on former state House Speaker House Bobby Harrell was transferred to the AG's office. The report mentioned state representatives Rick Quinn Sr. and Rick Quinn Jr. suggesting misconduct by the younger Quinn. In early 2014, Wilson recused himself from the investigation and appointed David Pascoe, the solicitor for the 1st Judicial Circuit, as special prosecutor. Harrell pleaded guilty and resigned from the House in late 2014. Pascoe urged the AG's Office to investigate the Quinns. After Harrell pleaded guilty to misusing campaign money and resigned from the House in late 2014, Pascoe emailed the attorney general's office, urging the Quinns be investigated. Wilson secretly recruited Quinn to assist in drafting a response letter to Pascoe, saying that his role as a special prosecutor was complete; Wilson later said that this was a mistake.

In March 2016, after Pascoe continued to use the state grand jury to investigate possible corruption in the General Assembly, Wilson attempted to fire Pascoe, triggering a political firestorm in the state. Adam Piper, a Wilson aide, launched a secret effort to smear Pascoe. Pascoe challenged Wilson's attempt to fire him, arguing that the attorney general could not do so after previously recusing himself on the grounds of a conflict of interest.  In July 2016, the South Carolina Supreme Court sided with Pascoe on a 4–1 decision, rejecting Wilson's attempt to fire him as special prosecutor. Ultimately, the younger Rick Quinn resigned from office and pleaded guilty to a reduced charge, while the elder Quinn agreed to testify before the state grand jury, and his consulting firm pleaded guilty to failing to register as a lobbyist.

In October 2018, after a two-year investigation, a state grand jury issued a 270-page report on corruption in South Carolina, including blurred relationships between businesses, legislators, lobbyists, and political consultants. The grand jury determined that Wilson's failure to act following the guilty plea of Harrell and the Quinns impeded an investigation into state government corruption, although it made no finding as to Wilson's intent. The investigation and the report focused in part on Wilson's close ties to Richard Quinn, a prominent Republican political strategist in the state, and his son Rick Quinn Jr., who had been a member of the state House. Wilson had paid the elder Quinn's firm more than $220,000 for political strategy services in two election campaigns. Wilson denied wrongdoing and asserted that the 2018 grand jury's report was politically motivated. Judge Clifton Newman ordered that the report be released to the public.

Environmental litigation
In 2021, Wilson joined a Republican lawsuit challenging President Biden's order directing federal agencies to consider the costs of greenhouse gas pollution in making decisions. Wilson also joined another lawsuit challenging Biden's decision to revoke the federal permit for the Keystone XL Pipeline, an oil pipeline project 1,000 miles from South Carolina.

Abortion litigation
A staunch opponent of abortion, Wilson defended a state law banning most abortions in South Carolina from a constitutional challenge. In 2021, Wilson joined a U.S. Supreme Court filing calling on the Court to overturn Roe v. Wade.

Opposition to cannabis decriminalization 
In January 2019, Wilson described cannabis as "the most dangerous drug, because it is the most misunderstood drug" in the United States while denouncing legislation that would allow physicians to prescribe medical marijuana for patients. Wilson was one of 16 state attorneys general who did not support the SAFE Banking Act, which permitted the use of the banking system by cannabis-related businesses in states and territories in which cannabis is legal.

Wilson is the respondent of a ongoing lawsuit which alleges that Wilson and SLED denied him due process when they destroyed his hemp farm.

Efforts to subvert 2020 presidential election outcome

In December 2020, Wilson joined a lawsuit by 16 Republican state attorneys general urging the U.S. Supreme Court to overturn the results of the 2020 presidential election, specifically by challenging Joe Biden's victory in four states. The suit was based on Donald Trump's false claim of election fraud. The next month, in advance of the January 6 attack on the United States Capitol by a pro-Trump mob, the Republican Attorneys General Association, then chaired by Wilson, made robocalls encouraging "patriots" to march on Washington and demand that Congress overturn the election results and keep Trump in power. Wilson later acknowledged Biden as the election's winner on January 11, 2021. He said he was "completely unaware" of the Republican Attorneys General Association robocalls; the group's executive director, a former Wilson aide Adam Piper, resigned.

Five South Carolina attorneys subsequently filed complaints with the South Carolina Office of Disciplinary Counsel against Wilson, alleging that his participation in the Trump conspiracy lawsuit was an abuse of office that attempted to disenfranchise voters and had the effect of inflaming the subsequent insurrection. Wilson denied wrongdoing.

COVID-19 pandemic 

Wilson was one of 20 Republican state attorneys general who claimed that a portion of President Biden's COVID-19 relief package (specifically, a provision that states could not redirect federal stimulus money to reduce state tax rates) was unconstitutional.

In August 2021, ahead of the start of the 2021–2022 school year and amid an increasing number of COVID-19 cases in the state, Wilson said that the University of South Carolina could not implement indoor mask requirements for campus access. Wilson contended that a proviso (a type of state budget measure) passed by the General Assembly earlier that year prohibited such a mandate. After Wilson's intervention, the university dropped the requirement. However, later the same month, the South Carolina Supreme Court issued a unanimous decision that rejected Wilson's interpretation, and the University of South Carolina reinstated its mask mandate.

Wilson challenged the Joe Biden administration's vaccine requirement for large businesses.

Personal life
Wilson and his wife, Jennifer (nee Miskewicz), a former WIS-TV news reporter,  have two children.  Wilson joined the South Carolina National Guard in 1996 and received the Combat Action Badge for service in Iraq. Wilson's brother, Julian Wilson, is co-owner of the gun manufacturer and retailer Palmetto State Armory.

Electoral history

References

External links
South Carolina Attorney General official page
Alan Wilson for Attorney General campaign site

1973 births
21st-century American politicians
American adoptees
Francis Marion University alumni
Living people
National Guard (United States) officers
South Carolina National Guard personnel
People from West Columbia, South Carolina
South Carolina Attorneys General
South Carolina lawyers
South Carolina Republicans
University of South Carolina School of Law alumni